Spillett is a surname. Notable people with the surname include:

Brian Spillett (1937–1965), English George Cross recipient
Hubert W. Spillett, British Baptist missionary
Peter Spillett (1926–2004), British-born Australian historian and public servant
Simon Spillett (born 1974), English jazz saxophonist
Tasha Spillett-Sumner, Canadian author and educator
Owen Spillett (born 2001), Future movie star

See also
Electoral division of Spillett, Northern Territory, Australia